Chapel Hill Independent School District may refer to:

 Chapel Hill Independent School District (Smith County, Texas)
 Chapel Hill Independent School District (Titus County, Texas)